was a professional baseball league in Japan which operated from 1936 to 1949, before reorganizing in 1950 as Nippon Professional Baseball.

The league's dominant team was Tokyo Kyojin (renamed the Yomiuri Giants in 1947), which won nine league championships, including six in a row from 1938 to 1943, when many of Japan's best players were serving in the Imperial Japanese Army.

Standout players from the Japanese Baseball League era included Haruyasu Nakajima, Tetsuharu Kawakami, and Kazuto Tsuruoka; pitchers Hideo Fujimoto, Eiji Sawamura, Victor Starffin, and Tadashi Wakabayashi; and two-way players Fumio Fujimura, Shosei Go, Masaru Kageura, and Jiro Noguchi.

League structure 
Unlike American pro teams, Japanese Baseball League teams were usually named after their corporate owners/sponsors rather than the cities or regions in which they played. This was because Japanese franchising does not have strong territorial requirements as in the Major Leagues; as a result, the JBL teams clustered in metropolitan areas in Japan's center (Tokyo, Nagoya) and south (Osaka). As a result, teams were notorious for how often they changed their names, often because of changes in ownership/sponsorship (and also because of nationalistic regulations imposed during wartime, such as the outlawing of English team names). (The Yomiuri Giants, the Chunichi Dragons, and the Hanshin Tigers are the only surviving major clubs that have always been based in their respective cities. Additionally, the current Orix Buffaloes are a merger of two clubs which never left their hometown.)

Most Japanese Baseball League teams did not have an "official" home stadium; instead, teams played at any stadium in the area in which they were based. All league championships went to whoever had the best record at the end of the season, without a postseason series being played.

History 
The league was established on February 5, 1936, as the Japan Occupational Baseball League, with an initial complement of seven teams. Three of the teams were based in Tokyo, two in Osaka, and two in Nagoya. 

Due to a lack of position players, a number of players in the league both pitched and batted. At first (until after World War II), the JBL was a "dead ball" league, due to Japan conserving rubber (including inside baseballs) for its war efforts; instead it used Balatá inside the balls. Initially, the league played split seasons, doing so from 1936 to 1938. In the debut 1936 season, it split into spring, summer, and fall seasons, only keeping track of the standings in the fall season. The league played spring and fall seasons in 1937 (c. 100-game schedule in total) and 1938 (total 75-game schedule), adding one new team each year. 

The league was renamed the Japanese Baseball League in 1939, playing a 96-game schedule. Before the 1940 season, one of the founding teams, Nagoya Kinko (originally the Nagoya Golden Dolphins), merged with the Tokyo Senators. The 1940 season featured a 104-game schedule.

In October 1940 (responding to rising hostility toward the West due to World War II), the league outlawed the use of English in Japanese baseball. In response, the Korakuen Eagles became "Kurowashi", the Osaka Tigers became "Hanshin", the Tokyo Senators became "Tsubasa", and (eventually) Lion became "Asahi."

In 1941, the JBL appointed its first president, Jiro Morioka (formerly VP of Dai Tokyo). Morioka negotiated with the Japanese Imperial Army to keep professional baseball going through the early years of the Second World War.
 
The league played a 90-game schedule in 1941, a 104-game schedule in 1942, and an 84-game schedule in 1943.

Two Tokyo-based teams dissolved before the 1944 season: the Yamato Baseball Club (originally the Korakuen Eagles) and the Nishitetsu Baseball Club (originally the Tokyo Senators).

Due to the Pacific War, the 1944 season was truncated to c. 35 games, and the 1945 season was skipped entirely. Many players enlisted in the Japanese Imperial Army, with 72 of them losing their lives in the war. 

The league restarted on November 6, 1945, and a full season of 105 games was played the next year, with two new teams (both based in Tokyo) joining the league. One of the new teams, Gold Star, was owned by textile manufacturer Komajiro Tamura, who also owned Pacific (formerly Asahi).

Unable to compete against the more established JBL, however, the Kokumin League disbanded a few games into the 1947 fall season.

The Japanese Baseball League played a 119-game schedule in 1947. That year, baseball personality Sōtaro Suzuki proposed that JBL teams should have pet names like the Yomiuri Giants', whose pet name was "Kyojin", and names such as the Osaka Tigers' alias "Mouko" (fierce tiger), the revived Tokyo Senators' "Seito" (bluestockings) and the Pacific's "Taihei" (tranquility) began to be used by the press. However, some teams rejected the use of these pet names, so they were never fully adopted. The 1948 season had a 140-game schedule, and the 1949 season had a 134-game schedule.

After the 1949 season, the league reorganized into today's Nippon Professional Baseball (NPB). The four earliest-established clubs formerly in the Japanese Baseball League were placed in NPB's Central League, while the four later surviving franchises went to the Pacific League.

Foreign players 
Victor Starffin, an ethnic Russian pitcher, was a dominant player of the era and the first professional pitcher in Japan to win 300 games.

Shosei Go, nicknamed "The Human Locomotive", was a speedy player from Taiwan who played in the league for the Kyojin and the Tigers. He won the 1943 JBL Most Valuable Player award as a member of the champion Kyojin. Hiroshi Oshita was another Taiwanese player who starred in the JBL. From 1946 to 1949 he played for the Tokyo Senators/Tokyu Flyers. (After reorganization, Oshita stayed with the Flyers until 1951, and then moved to the Nishitetsu Lions, finishing his Japanese professional career with a .303 lifetime batting average, 201 home runs, and 861 RBI.)

Andrew "Bucky" Harris McGalliard (Japan's "Bucky Harris"), Herbert "Buster" North, and James E. "Jimmy Bonna" Bonner became the first Americans to play in Japan's professional baseball league in 1936. (Bonner was African-American, thus beating Jackie Robinson to professional baseball 11 years before Robinson broke in with the Brooklyn Dodgers.) They were joined by the Japanese-American players Kiyomi "Slim" Hirakawa, Fumito "Jimmy" Horio, Kazuyoshi "George" Matsuura,  Yoshio "Sam" Takahashi, and Tadashi "Bozo" Wakabayashi.

Teams

MVPs
 1937 (spring): Eiji Sawamura, Tokyo Kyojin, P
 1937 (fall): Harris McGalliard, Korakuen Eagles, C
 1938 (spring): Hisanori Karita, Tokyo Senators, 2B
 1938 (fall): Haruyasu Nakajima, Tokyo Kyojin, OF
 1939: Victor Starffin, Tokyo Kyojin, P
 1940: Victor Starffin, Tokyo Kyojin, P
 1941: Tetsuharu Kawakami, Tokyo Kyojin, 1B
 1942: Shigeru Mizuhara, Tokyo Kyojin, 2B
 1943: Shosei Go, Tokyo Kyojin, OF
 1944: Tadashi Wakabayashi, Hanshin, P
 1945: No league play because of World War II
 1946: Kazuto Tsuruoka, Kinki Great Ring, 3B
 1947: Tadashi Wakabayashi, Osaka Tigers, P
 1948: Kazuto Tsuruoka, Nankai, 3B
 1949: Fumio Fujimura, Osaka Tigers, 3B

Season-by-season standings 
Season champion in bold.

Notes

References

External links
 Japanese Baseball Data Archive at The Baseball Guru
 List of players at Japanese Baseball
 "Japanese Baseball League (Spring) (Foreign) Encyclopedia and History," (1936–1938) at Baseball-Reference.com
 "Japanese Baseball League (Fall) (Foreign) Encyclopedia and History," (1936–1938 at Baseball-Reference.com
 "Japanese Baseball League (Foreign) Encyclopedia and History," (1939–1949 at Baseball-Reference.com

Defunct baseball leagues in Japan
Sports leagues established in 1936
Sports leagues disestablished in 1949
1936 establishments in Japan
1936 disestablishments in Japan